The Putnam County Courthouse in Winfield, West Virginia was built in 1900 to replace an 1848 structure which partially collapsed in 1899. The Romanesque Revival building was designed by architect Frank Pierce Milburn with a hip roof and octagonal towers at all four corners. It is similar to the Summers County Courthouse in Hinton, West Virginia.

References

Courthouses on the National Register of Historic Places in West Virginia
Buildings and structures in Putnam County, West Virginia
County courthouses in West Virginia
Frank Pierce Milburn buildings
Romanesque Revival architecture in West Virginia
National Register of Historic Places in Putnam County, West Virginia